Hong Kong Express Airways Limited, commonly known as Hong Kong Express or HK Express, is a Hong Kong–based low-cost airline fully owned by Cathay Pacific Airways. It provides scheduled air service to 27 destinations in Asia, including Cambodia, China, Japan, South Korea, the Northern Mariana Islands, Taiwan, Thailand and Vietnam. The airline's main hub at Hong Kong International Airport uses a fleet that consists exclusively of the Airbus A320 family. The company slogan is Your Move.

The head office of HK Express is located in Cathay House, 11 Tung Fai Road, Hong Kong International Airport, Chek Lap Kok, Hong Kong.

History

2004–2006: Founding 

Hong Kong Express Airways Limited was incorporated on 10 March 2004, with the former Chinese name, added on 21 April 2004. The airline was owned by Macau casino entrepreneur Stanley Ho. In July 2004, Hong Kong's helicopter operator Heli Hong Kong officially announced plans to commence fixed-wing operation via Hong Kong Express, to become Hong Kong's fourth passenger airline. It was planning to introduce regional jet services to secondary cities in mainland China and was in negotiations with Bombardier and Embraer for the lease of several 50- or 70-seat regional jets. In April 2005, the airline was granted permission to transport passengers, cargo and mail from Hong Kong to selected destinations in China and permitted to apply for traffic rights to serve 15 Chinese cities. The next month, it received approval to operate scheduled air services to five cities in China, including Chongqing, Guangzhou, Hangzhou, Nanjing and Ningbo. The airline had its Air Operator's Certificate varied in July 2005 for the operation of Embraer 170 aircraft. The same month, it took delivery of its first of four 76-seat twin-jet Embraer 170, leased from General Electric Commercial Aviation Services (GECAS), and became the Asian launch operator of this regional jet. Two more aircraft were delivered in 2005, with the remaining delivered in May 2006.

The airline's initial use of its first Embraer 170 was on charter services to Taichung, Taiwan, on 3 September 2005. 
The first scheduled passenger services began to Guangzhou on 8 September 2005, with services to Hangzhou and Ningbo following in October 2005 and December 2005, respectively. On 19 November 2005, Hong Kong Air Transport Licensing Authority (ATLA) granted the airline additional licences to operate scheduled services to 16 destinations in mainland China, as well as Koh Samui, Okinawa, Siem Reap and Taichung. Scheduled passenger services to Chiang Mai and Chongqing were inaugurated on 22 June 2006 and 31 July 2006, respectively.

2006–2013: Acquired by HNA and expansion 
On 3 August 2006, HNA Group, the parent company of Hainan Airlines, announced a finalised agreement to acquire a 45 percent stake in Hong Kong Express; this followed an earlier purchase of a 45 percent holdings in CR Airways in June. Under the terms of the agreement, the airline would remain a Hong Kong registered airline and there would be no changes to the current operations. Analysts said that the HNA Group had the weakest international network amongst all the mainland airlines. By purchasing both Hong Kong Express and CR Airways, it would enable Hainan Airlines to expand internationally via its junior partners from Hong Kong.

On 23 January 2008, the airline was the third Hong Kong carrier permitted by the Civil Aviation Department to operate flights to and from Beijing and Shanghai. To facilitate the expansion, it announced that six Boeing 737-800 would be added to its fleet before the end of the year.

2013–2019: Low-cost carrier transformation 

On 26 June 2013, Hong Kong Express announced its intention to transform into a low-cost carrier (LCC), and renamed to "HK Express", under the direction of the deputy CEO Andrew Cowen. Hong Kong Express' first flights as a LCC commenced 27 October 2013, to five destinations in Asia. The airline has since added routes to Tokyo, Penang, Osaka, Fukuoka, Seoul and Busan.  There are plans for the airline's fleet to increase by five Airbus A320 in 2014, taking the total number of aircraft to 11 within the year and with a longer-term aim of having over 30 Airbus A320 by 2018.

On 19 July 2017, during the annual Hong Kong Book Fair, HK Express launch an activities planning service known as U-Explore in collaboration with Hong Kong-based travel activities booking platform, Klook.

On 9 November 2017, HK Express was banned by the Civil Aviation Department from adding new flights, routes or aircraft until 30 April 2018. This followed the cancellation of 18 flights to Osaka, Nagoya and Seoul during National Day Golden Week that year, affecting about 2,000 passengers. However, the delivery of four new aircraft was later permitted, provided they were used on existing routes only.

2019–present: Acquisition by Cathay Pacific 

Cathay Pacific executives confirmed in late February 2019 that it was in "active discussions" about its interest of a full or partial takeover of HK Express from current owner HNA Group, although an agreement had yet to be reached at the time.

On 25 March 2019, the South China Morning Post reported that Cathay Pacific had agreed to buy the airline.

On 27 March 2019, Cathay Pacific agreed to take over HK Express for HK$4.93 billion (US$628 million), with the transaction to close by the end of 2019. At the time, HK Express operated 23 Airbus A320 aircraft on 25 routes from Hong Kong to Japan and Southeast Asia with a net asset value of HK$1.12 billion, while the airline recorded a profit of HK$60 million in 2017, but recorded a loss of HK$141 million in 2018. The acquisition will be paid with HK$2.25 billion in cash and HK$2.68 billion in promissory loan notes, and HK Express will subsequently withdraw from U-FLY Alliance. By the time the acquisition transaction is completed, HK Express will become Cathay Pacific's wholly owned subsidiary. Following the acquisition, Cathay Pacific has stated that it intends to continue the operation of HK Express as a stand-alone low-cost carrier separate from its existing full-service operations.

However, according to the announcement, a firm of solicitors acting for a shareholder of an intermediate holding company of HK Express, has contested the seller's entry into an agreement for the transaction. It also states that Cathay Pacific has the right to terminate the share purchase if proceedings are commenced to prevent the transaction. The contesting party is widely believed to be the chairman and the major shareholder of HK Express, Zhong Guosong, who has clarified that he has no intention to sell the company and will potentially launch legal action regarding the sale.

On 19 July 2019, Cathay Pacific announced the acquisition of Hong Kong Express Airways had been completed. HK Express is now a wholly owned subsidiary of Cathay Pacific. However, HK Express will continue to operate as a low-cost carrier stand-alone airline.

Impact of COVID-19 
HK Express suspended all flight operations from 23 March to 30 April 2020 due to reduced demand caused by the COVID-19 pandemic.

On 10 June 2020, HK Express announced another suspension of flight operations, which was followed with a Flight Operations Resumption Plan, and announced resumption of all operations gradually from 2 August 2020. 

HK Express has then recovered, despite ongoing pandemic in Hong Kong, and announced new services to Taipei, Kaohsiung, and Singapore.

Corporate affairs 

The current head office is in the Cathay Dragon House at Hong Kong International Airport in Chek Lap Kok.

The head office of HK Express was previously located at One Citygate in Tung Chung, Lantau.

Senior leadership 
 Chairman: Ronald Lam (since August 2019)
 Chief Executive: Jeanette Mao (since April 2023)

List of former chairmen 

 Stanley Ho (2004–2007)
 Ronnie Choi (2007–2008)
 Yang Jianhong (2008–2013)
 Jimmy Ma (2014–2017)
 Zhong Guosong (2017–2019)
 Rupert Hogg (2019)

List of former chief executives 

 Andrew Tse (2004–2007)
 Kalid Razack (2007–2015)
 Andrew Cowen (2015–2017)
 Li Dianchun (2017–2018)
 Luo Cheng (2018–2019)
 Ronald Lam (2019)
 Mandy Ng (2019–2023)

Destinations 
These destinations are currently served by HK Express.

Fleet 
, the HK Express fleet consists of the following aircraft:

Former fleet 

HK Express has previously operated the following aircraft:

Boeing 737-800
Embraer 170

Livery

Original livery 

The original livery features a white fuselage with a blue engine and wingtip. The words "Hong Kong Express" are painted under the windows, with its former name "" at the rear door.

Second livery 
The second livery features the standard HNA Group Airline livery, almost identical with the livery of Hong Kong Airlines, with the golden bauhinia design on its logo. The only difference is the word "Express" in block letters painted under the windows.

Current livery 
The current livery of Hong Kong Express is followed by the logo redesign of the airline. It features a white fuselage with a purple and red theme, and has a Hong Kong city silhouette in purple on the tail.

Loyalty programme 
On 14 April 2016, Hong Kong Express launched a loyalty programme named "Reward-U". Flights and gifts can be redeemed on the official website. The programme is free to join, only individuals two years old or above can join the programme. Each eligible Hong Kong Dollar spend earns ten points, but U-Biz passengers can earn 20 points per dollar spent. At most five members can form a reward-U crew to consolidate the points. Reward-U officially ceased its operations on 31 December 2019, merging with AsiaMiles.

Controversies

Sudden flight cancellation 
On 29 September 2017, HK Express suddenly cancelled 18 flights to Osaka, Nagoya and Incheon on 1 and 8 October without any notice. Because the flights cancelled covered the National Day of China and Mid-Autumn Festival holidays, 2,070 passengers were affected. HK Express felt extremely sorry for the inconvenience caused, and proposed a series of alternative solutions for the affected passengers, like travelling on another airline, changing travel dates, changing destination and a full refund. The Civil Aviation Department was unsatisfied by the behaviour of HK Express, and required the airline to submit a detailed report regarding the causes, short-term and long-term solutions to the incidents.

Inappropriate promotion methods 
In July 2018, HK Express was found posting advertisements under street signposts, with QR codes available for citizens to scan to get information and participate in games to win prizes. The advertisements did not show the airline's name nor its logo; however, names of Japanese places were shown. District council members said that these materials might cause chaos and mislead citizens, due to the fact that Highways Department strictly prohibits organisations from posting anything on their signposts. HK Express apologised for organising this activity, stopped the activity on 18 July 2018, and removed the advertisements.

Incidents 
To date, HK Express has never had a fatality or a hull loss incident.

 On 12 August, 2020, two non-operating Airbus A321s collided while being towed.
 On 3 January, 2023, flight UO600 heading from Hong Kong to Fukuoka, Japan, descended from  40 minutes into the flight, before turning back and landing safely at Hong Kong International Airport.

See also 

List of airlines of Hong Kong
List of companies of Hong Kong
Transport in Hong Kong

References

External links 

 
 HK Express Holidays website

Airlines established in 2004
Airlines of Hong Kong
Hong Kong brands
Swire Group
U-FLY Alliance
Low-cost carriers
2004 establishments in Hong Kong